Georgios Paligeorgos (born 9 February 1990) is a Greek footballer currently playing for Tyrnavos in the Greek Football League. He has previously played for AEK Athens, Anagennisi Karditsa, Thrasyvoulos, Ethnikos Asteras and Iraklis.

He began his career at "Elpides Agriniou", and moved to AEK's youth teams in the summer of 2005. Along with Panagiotis Tachtsidis, Michalis Pavlis, Savvas Gentsoglou and many other AEK youth players, they compose a group of players that AEK bases a lot on for the future of the club.

Career

Youth years
He began his career at "Elpides Agriniou", and moved to AEK Athens' youth teams in the Summer of 2005. Along with Panagiotis Tachtsidis, Michalis Pavlis, Savvas Gentsoglou and many other AEK young players, they composed a group of players that AEK based a lot on for the future of the club.

Professional career
He was promoted to AEK Athens senior team the 2006–07 season and signed a professional contract until the end of 2010–11 season. His only league appearance with AEK was in May 2007 against Panionios.

For the 2007–2008 season, Paligeorgos was loaned out by AEK to Greek Third Division club, Anagennisi Karditsa. He played a major role in Karditsa's promotion to the Second Division. His loan to Karditsa was extended for one more year, before he was loaned to Thrasyvoulos F.C. for the 2009–11 Beta Ethniki season.

In January 2012, Paligeorgos signed for Iraklis 1908. Οn 31 July 2014 he signed a contract with Greek Football League club Tyrnavos.

References

1990 births
Living people
Greek footballers
AEK Athens F.C. players
Anagennisi Karditsa F.C. players
Thrasyvoulos F.C. players
Ethnikos Asteras F.C. players
Iraklis Thessaloniki F.C. players
Association football midfielders
Footballers from Agrinio